Sheikh Fazilatunnesa Mujib (8 August 1930 – 15 August 1975), also known by her daak naam Renu, was the wife of Sheikh Mujibur Rahman, the first President of Bangladesh. She is the mother of Sheikh Hasina, who now leads Bangladesh. She was assassinated with her husband and three sons.

Early life and marriage
Sheikh Fazilatunnesa was born in 1930, to a Bengali Muslim family in the village of Tungipara, Gopalganj in 1930. She had Iraqi Arab ancestry through her grandfather Sheikh Abdul Hamid, who was a direct descendant of 15th-century Muslim preacher Sheikh Awwal of Baghdad. Her father, Sheikh Zahurul Hoque, and mother, Husne Ara Begum, died when she was three years old.

She was paternal cousin of her husband Sheikh Mujibur Rahman. When Begum Fazilatunnesa was only 3 and Sheikh Mujib was 13, their marriage had been fixed by elders in the family. Renu was only 8 years old when she was married to her husband, who himself was just 18, in 1938. The couple later had two daughters Sheikh Hasina and Sheikh Rehana, as well as three sons Sheikh Kamal, Sheikh Jamal and Sheikh Russel. Fazilatunnesa Mujib was under house arrest during Bangladesh Liberation War until 17 December.

Assassination

On 15 August 1975, a group of junior army officers attacked the presidential residence with tanks and assassinated Mujib, his family and personal staff. Only her daughters Sheikh Hasina and Sheikh Rehana, who were visiting West Germany, escaped. They were banned from returning to Bangladesh. Others killed included her 10-year-old son Sheikh Russel, two other sons Sheikh Kamal, Sheikh Jamal, daughters-in-law Sultana Kamal and Rosy Jamal, brothers-in-law  Abdur Rab Serniabat and Sheikh Abu Naser, nephew Sheikh Fazlul Haque Mani and his wife Arzoo Moni. The coup was planned by disgruntled Awami League colleagues and military officers, which included Mujib's colleague and former confidant Khondaker Mostaq Ahmad, who became his immediate successor. Lawrence Lifschultz has alleged that the CIA was involved in the coup and assassination, basing his assumption on statements by the then US ambassador in Dhaka Eugene Booster.

Mujib's death plunged the nation into many years of political turmoil. The coup leaders were soon overthrown and a series of counter-coups and political assassinations paralysed the country. Order was largely restored after a coup in 1977 gave control to the army chief Ziaur Rahman. Declaring himself President in 1978, Ziaur Rahman signed the Indemnity Ordinance, giving immunity from prosecution to the men who plotted Mujib's overthrow and assassination.

Legacy
Bangabandhu Memorial Trust in partnership with Malaysian hospital chain KPJ Healthcare built the Sheikh Fazilatunnesa Mujib Memorial KPJ Specialised Hospital and Nursing College in her memory. The hospital was inaugurated by Bangladeshi Prime Minister Sheikh Hasina and Malaysian Prime Minister Najib Razak. A dormitory in Eden college is named after her. Sheikh Fazilatunnesa Mujib Hall is a female dorm in Rajshahi University. Govt. Sheikh Fazilatunnesa Mujib Mohila College is located in Tangail.

References

External links
 Assassination of Sheikh Mujibur Rahman
 Sheikh Mujib A History of Bangladesh

First Ladies of Bangladesh
1975 deaths
Burials at Banani Graveyard
Sheikh Mujibur Rahman family
1930 births
Recipients of the Independence Day Award
Bangladeshi people of Arab descent